A radiation accident occurred in Prachin Buri Province, Thailand in March 2023. The accident happened when an insecurely stored Caesium-137 radiation source was recovered by scrap metal

References